Light of the Stable is a Christmas album by Emmylou Harris. It was originally released in 1979 by Warner Bros. Records but has since gone through several intervening releases. The 1992 Warner release was a remastered version of the original with a different album cover. The latest edition was released in 2004 by Rhino Records. It contains three newly recorded tracks in addition to remastered versions of the ten original tracks. Its cover came from the record sleeve of the original 45-rpm single version of "Light of the Stable" that was released in 1975.  The title song featured harmony vocals from Neil Young, Dolly Parton and Linda Ronstadt.

Critical reception

Mark Deming of AllMusic gives the album 4 out of a possible 5 stars and writes, "Emmylou Harris is an artist with the rare sort of voice that communicates an honest and firmly grounded humanity while possessing a crystalline purity that verges on the angelic. In short, she was a singer born to make a great Christmas album, and in 1979 she did just that with Light of the Stable"

Gavin Edwards lists this album at No, 19 in Rolling Stone's 40 Essential Christmas Albums list. He writes, "Harris has always sung like an angel, and on this 1979 album she played the part, a living herald of joyful Nativity tidings. Some of the other golden-throated seraphim providing backing vocals: Linda Ronstadt, Dolly Parton, and, er, Neil Young."

Jim Caligiuri of The Austin Chronicle gives this album 4 stars and says, "Emmylou Harris possesses the voice of an angel, so it only makes sense that her versions of Christmas classics are unequaled, as are special guests Willie Nelson, Neil Young, and Dolly Parton."

Track listing

Original release

2004 expanded version

Personnel
 Brian Ahern – acoustic guitar, percussion, 6-string bass
 Nancy Ahern – backing vocals
 Mike Bowden – bass
 Brian Bowers – autoharp
 Tony Brown – clavinet
 James Burton – electric guitar 
 Rodney Crowell – acoustic guitar
 Hank DeVito – pedal steel guitar
 Emory Gordy Jr. – bass
 Glen Hardin – piano
 Sharon Hicks – backing vocals
 Albert Lee – mandolin
 Willie Nelson – backing vocals
 Dolly Parton – backing vocals
 Frank Reckard – electric guitar 
 Linda Ronstadt – backing vocals
 Ricky Skaggs – banjo, mandolin, violin, acoustic guitar
 John Ware – drums
 Cheryl Warren – backing vocals
 Neil Young – backing vocals
 Emmylou Harris – vocals, acoustic guitar

Charts

References

Christmas albums by American artists
Emmylou Harris albums
Albums produced by Brian Ahern (producer)
Warner Records albums
Rhino Records albums
1979 Christmas albums
Country Christmas albums